Henry "Hank" Åkervall (August 24, 1937 – February 18, 2000) was a Canadian ice hockey defenceman and Olympian.

Åkervall won a national title in 1962 with Michigan Tech. After graduating he played with Team Canada at the 1964 Winter Olympics held in Innsbruck, Austria.

After his hockey career he coached the Lakehead Nor'Westers to an International Collegiate Hockey Association championship in 1967, was recreation director for Thunder Bay.

Awards and honors

References

External links

1937 births
2000 deaths
Canadian ice hockey defencemen
Hamilton Tiger Cubs players
Ice hockey players at the 1964 Winter Olympics
Michigan Tech Huskies men's ice hockey players
Olympic ice hockey players of Canada
Sportspeople from Thunder Bay
Tappara players
Canadian expatriate ice hockey players in Finland
NCAA men's ice hockey national champions
AHCA Division I men's ice hockey All-Americans